L. E. Fletcher Technical Community College is a community college in Schriever, Louisiana in Terrebonne Parish. The school was founded on June 23, 1948.

Its service area includes Iberia, Lafourche, St. Mary, and Terrebonne parishes, as well as the southern section of St. Martin Parish.

Academics
The college provides both academic and technical training. It offers programs in arts and sciences, business, manufacturing and services, nursing and health, and Petroleum.

References

External links
Official website

Community colleges in Louisiana
Educational institutions established in 1948
1948 establishments in Louisiana
Universities and colleges accredited by the Southern Association of Colleges and Schools
Buildings and structures in Terrebonne Parish, Louisiana
Education in Terrebonne Parish, Louisiana